Scott Thomsen (born December 31, 1993) is a former American professional soccer player who played for USL League One club Richmond Kickers as a defender.

Career

Early career
Thomsen attended Christian Brothers Academy during high school and earned state and regional honors as a member of the soccer team. In 2010, Thomsen joined the New York Red Bulls academy, where he played primarily as a midfielder, and scored 27 goals during his five-year career.

After high school, Thomsen attended the University of Virginia and played 66 games throughout his four-year career, totaling 3 goals and 18 assists. As a freshman, he led the team in minutes with 1,991 as well as assists with 8. In 2014, he played in all 23 matches as a junior and played a crucial role in the Cavilers winning their seventh NCAA College Cup. During his senior year, Thomsen was limited to only 5 games due to a sports hernia injury and was sidelined for the remainder of the season.

New York Red Bulls
On December 23, 2015, Thomsen signed a Homegrown Contract with the New York Red Bulls. After only two and a half months with the club, Thomsen was waived before the season on March 7.

Richmond Kickers
On July 22, 2016, Thomsen signed with the Richmond Kickers of the United Soccer League on a one-year contract. He made his professional debut on August 6 in a 2–1 victory against FC Montreal.

Career statistics

References

External links 
 

1993 births
Living people
American soccer players
Association football defenders
Virginia Cavaliers men's soccer players
New York Red Bulls players
Richmond Kickers players
Orlando City B players
Homegrown Players (MLS)
Christian Brothers Academy (New Jersey) alumni
People from Brick Township, New Jersey
Soccer players from New Jersey
Sportspeople from Ocean County, New Jersey
USL League One players